Methodism in Sichuan refers to the history and implantation of Methodism in the Chinese province of Sichuan (formerly romanized as Szechwan, Szechuan, Sz-chuan or Sz-chuen; also referred to as "West China"). Methodism, along with Anglicanism, were the two largest Protestant denominations in that province.

History

American Methodist Episcopal Mission 

The first Methodist missionaries to reach Sichuan were those of the American Methodist Episcopal Mission (AMEM) led by Rev. Lucius Nathan Wheeler, who arrived in Chungking in 1882. Their early efforts encountered strong resistance and riots that led to the abandonment of the mission. It was not until 1889 that these Methodists came back and started the mission again.

The AMEM mission work concentrated within a diamond-shaped area with the cities of Chengtu, Suining, Tzechung and Chungking as bases. Apart from being one of the four founding societies of the West China Union University in 1910, the AMEM had several colleges, schools and hospitals in those above-mentioned cities, as well as an Institutional Church in Chengtu and a Lewis Memorial Institutional Church in Chungking.

The Rev. Dr. Joseph Beech, a Wesleyan University graduate and member of Psi Upsilon and Phi Beta Kappa, played an instrumental role in founding and running West China Union University. He served as its founding president and later its chancellor.

Ailie Gale served as hospital administrator for five years at Chadwick Memorial Hospital in Tzechung beginning in 1941. She left in 1946 to reunite with her husband, as she recognized escalating political conflict.

Canadian Methodist Mission 

In 1891, a West China Mission group of the Missionary Society of the Methodist Church in Canada (MCC) was formed in Toronto, consisting of four missionaries and their wives. Two of the men were ministers (founder of the mission, and George E. Hartwell), and two were doctors (Omar L. Kilborn and David W. Stevenson). Before their departure, a farewell service was held in Elm Street Methodist Church, Toronto. They left Canada for China on 4 October.

The party arrived in the provincial capital Chengtu the following year. Work began immediately in the capital, and two years later, in Kiatingfu, with the establishment of mission stations in both cities. On April 16, 1893, the missionaries welcomed their first convert, a woman. She impressed the missionaries with her straightforward manner, a rare trait in a Chinese, and by her remarkable progress in learning to read.

In 1895, a serious outbreak of anti-foreign agitation spread throughout the province. In Chengtu, all the MCC mission property was entirely destroyed; and all missionaries of all missions, Protestant and Roman Catholic alike, were thankful to escape with their lives.

In 1897, the Canadian Methodist Mission Press was established in Kiatingfu, but was moved to the capital city of Chengtu in 1903. This press produced publications mostly in English, Tibetan, Chinese and Hua Miao, but also printed language lessons in French and German. In addition to printing for the various missions in the western province, a certain amount of work was done for local schools and non-missionary foreigners. Notable among its printings was The West China Missionary News, first published in 1899, being the first and longest-running English-language newspaper in Sichuan province.

In 1906, eight Victoria College students formed the Victoria Eight, nicknamed "The Missionary Gang" to China and Japan. They left Canada in November. Acta Victoriana celebrated their departure by publishing in the November 1906 issue the students' graduating photographs on the journal's frontispiece, and a poem titled "L'Envoi" by Edward Wilson Wallace, one of the Eight. Six of these men were sent to Sichuan, where they arrived in 1910 after two years of language learning.

After 1900, eight more mission stations were established in Jenshow (1905), Junghsien (1905), Penghsien (1907), Tzeliutsing (1907), Luchow (1908), Chungking (1910), Chungchow (1911) and Fowchow (1913). The MCC missionaries travelled through the province building churches and residential compounds with missionary houses. They rented or bought local buildings to run services, prayer meetings and Bible study classes. They preached in markets and church halls, established day schools and boarding schools at the primary and high schools for both boys and girls, besides opening orphanages. The medical missionaries opened clinics, dispensaries, and hospitals. They served in the province's Red Cross work during the years 1913–16.

The MCC was one of the four mission societies responsible for the creation of West China Union University in 1910, together with American Baptist Foreign Mission Society (American Baptist Churches USA), American Methodist Episcopal Mission (Methodist Episcopal Church), and Friends' Foreign Mission Association (British Quakers). There they opened their own Hart College, and the university's Medical and Dentistry Departments owed their success to these Canadian missionaries. That same year (1910), the MCC took over Chungking district from London Missionary Society.

In 1917, the Silver Jubilee of the founding of the West China Mission was celebrated among Canadian Methodists. On May 27, 1918, the MCC had its first preparatory conference held at Junghsien. At this conference, the first local missionary was appointed and sent to the hill tribes northwest of Chengtu. The personnel of the conference included missionaries, evangelists, probationers, and lay delegates.

By the end of 1921, the Methodists enrolled almost one half of the Protestant Christians in Sichuan. Following the merger of the Methodist Church of Canada into the United Church of Canada in 1925, the latter assumed responsibility for the MCC. At that time, the MCC was the largest mission of the newly-founded Church. There were 10 central stations, 8 hospitals, 10 dispensaries, 10 higher primary schools, 2 middle schools and 126 lower primary schools, as well as 214 Canadians, both men and women, working as mission staff. Each station executed missionary work in three forms: evangelistic, educational, and medical. As a whole, the mission created a Christian community of about 10,000 people. In 1927, many Canadian missionaries were ordered to evacuate Sichuan due to communist uprisings and the subsequent Chinese Civil War. This evacuation led to a number of staff resignations which caused a decline in the West China Mission work.

By 1934, the MCC had joined the Church of Christ in China (CCC); an annual general meeting of the CCC's Szechwan Association was held on February 9, 1939.

Current situation 

After the communist takeover of China in 1949, missionaries were expelled, most church activities were banned, and all mission schools and hospitals were taken over by the government. Protestant Churches in China were also forced to sever their ties with respective overseas Churches, which has thus led to the merging of all the denominations into communist-sanctioned Three-Self Patriotic Church.

The history of Canadian West China Mission was largely forgotten by both Canada and China, and once suppressed by Chinese government not keen to acknowledge the work of foreign faith workers, until, according to Nathan VanderKlippe's report in 2017, "the past few years, [...] the story of the West China Mission is now being revived with a caveat. The missionaries are not referred to as such. They are, instead, called 'volunteers'."

Gallery

See also 

 Christianity in Sichuan
 Catholic Church in Sichuan
 Protestantism in Sichuan
 Anglicanism in Sichuan
 Quakerism in Sichuan
 Baptist Christianity in Sichuan
 Seventh-day Adventist Church in Sichuan
 Anti-Christian Movement (China)
 Anti-missionary riots in China
 Chongqing Chinese Self-supporting Methodist Church
 Denunciation Movement
 House church (China)
 :Category:Methodist missionaries in Sichuan

References

Bibliography 
 
 
 
 
 
 
 

 
Sichuan
History of Christianity in Sichuan